BBC Young Dancer is a televised national dance competition, broadcast on BBC Four and BBC Two since 2015. The competition, inspired by the success of the biennal BBC Young Musician of the Year, is designed for British amateur dancers of ballet, contemporary, hip hop and South Asian dance, all of whom must be aged between 16 and 20.

History
BBC Young Dancer was launched in October 2014 by Director-General of the BBC, Tony Hall and was part of BBC Four's Year of Song and Dance. Cuban ballet dancer Carlos Acosta was the competition's ambassador. On 14 January 2015, ballet dancer and Strictly Come Dancing judge Darcey Bussell was announced as co-presenter and dance expert for the Grand Final of the inaugural competition, which was aired live from Sadler's Wells Theatre on BBC Two in May. Zoe Ball and Clemency Burton-Hill were her co-hosts. There were different judges for each style. The category finals for each style were filmed at the Riverfront Arts Centre in Newport and later broadcast weekly on BBC Four. Contemporary dancer Connor Scott won the inaugural competition on 9 May 2015. The grand final was judged by a panel of dance experts: Matthew Bourne, Mavin Khoo, Wayne McGregor, Tamara Rojo, Kenrick Sandy and Alistair Spalding.

The next competition was held in 2017, contemporary dancer Nafisah Baba was announced as the winner of the overall title on 22 April. The category finals were moved to The Lowry in Salford, however the grand final remained at Sadler's Wells Theatre. The televised grand final was hosted by Bussell, Anita Rani and Ore Oduba; it was judged by Kevin O'Hare, Jasmin Vardimon, Marc Brew, Kate Prince, Kenneth Tharp, and Nahid Siddiqui. 

The 2019 title, held on 18 May at Birmingham Hippodrome, was won by street dancer Max Revell. The judges this year were McGregor, Shobana Jeyasingh, Emma Gladstone, Christopher Hampson, Junior Bosila Banya and Chitra Sundaram.

The competition returned in 2022 with a new format open to all dance styles; the category finals in Salford were removed and replaced by in-person auditions held in front of a professional panel of judges in Shoreditch, London with those successful in this round making it through to the final ten who attend a week-long dance residency at Dartington Hall in Devon. Across the four episode series, the finalists are put through their paces by leading choreographers to prepare new works for the grand final in London’s Roundhouse where the winner is crowned. The grand final was judged by Prince, Arthur Pita, Subathra Subramaniam and Ryoichi Hirano.

Hosts
The following have hosted stages of the competition:

 Darcey Bussell (2015–2017, finals only)
 Zoe Ball (2015 final)
 Clemency Burton-Hill (2015 final)
 Anita Rani (2017–2019)
 Ore Oduba (2017 final, 2019)
 Clara Amfo (2022)

Winners

Past finalists

Key

2015

2017

2019

2022

References

External links
 

British biennial events
Dance competition television shows
BBC Television shows
BBC Cymru Wales television shows
British television specials
Awards established in 2015
Young Dancer
Early career awards
2015 establishments in the United Kingdom